Tazehabad-e Qazi Ali (also Romanized as Tāzehābād-e Qāẕī ‘Alī and Tāzehābād Qāẕī ‘Alī; also known as Tāzehābād-e Qāzī) is a village in Saral Rural District, Saral District, Divandarreh County, Kurdistan Province, Iran. At the 2006 census, its population was 87, in 16 families.

References 

Towns and villages in Divandarreh County
Kurdish settlements in Kurdistan Province